Makana Nsimba Baku (born 8 April 1998) is a German professional footballer who plays as a left winger for Ekstraklasa club Legia Warsaw.

Career

Club
In June 2019, it was announced Baku would join 2. Bundesliga side Holstein Kiel from SG Sonnenhof Großaspach for an undisclosed transfer fee having agreed a three-year contract.

International
He is available to play for either Germany or DR Congo. He had played five games for Germany's youth teams, though never made any major appearance for the senior German team.

Personal life
Born in Germany, Baku is of Congolese descent. He is the twin brother of the footballer Ridle Baku.

References

External links
 

1998 births
Living people
Sportspeople from Mainz
German footballers
German sportspeople of Democratic Republic of the Congo descent
Footballers from Rhineland-Palatinate
Association football forwards
Germany under-21 international footballers
SV Gonsenheim players
SG Sonnenhof Großaspach players
Holstein Kiel players
Warta Poznań players
Göztepe S.K. footballers
Legia Warsaw players
3. Liga players
2. Bundesliga players
Ekstraklasa players
Süper Lig players
German expatriate footballers
German expatriate sportspeople in Poland
Expatriate footballers in Poland
German expatriate sportspeople in Turkey
Expatriate footballers in Turkey